Robert J. Fredrickson (born May 13, 1971) is a former National Football League linebacker who played 9 seasons for the Los Angeles/Oakland Raiders, Detroit Lions, and Arizona Cardinals. Rob attended Michigan State University and was a 4-time Academic All-Big Ten recipient and earned All-American honors.  Rob Fredrickson was drafted in the 1st round of the 1994 NFL Draft by the Los Angeles Raiders.  Rob was selected to the NFL All-Rookie 1st Team in 1994.  Rob played Linebacker for the Detroit Lions in 1998 and signed as a free agent with the Arizona Cardinals in 1999.  Rob Fredrickson holds the modern-era Arizona Cardinals record for most tackles in a game with 22 tackles vs. the New York Jets in 1999.  Rob retired from the NFL in 2003.

Rob Fredrickson continues to be active in the Phoenix community and is a member of the Phoenix charitable volunteer group, The Thunderbirds.  As hosts of the Waste Management Phoenix Open, The Thunderbirds raised a record $13.2 million ($13,254,334) for local charities through proceeds from the 2019 tournament.  The Thunderbirds and the Waste Management Phoenix Open have raised more than $81 million ($81,672,224) for local charities since 2010 when Waste Management became title sponsor. In its history, dating back to 1932, The Thunderbirds and the Phoenix Open have raised more than $147 million ($147,718,790) for charities in Arizona. 

1971 births
Living people
American football outside linebackers
Los Angeles Raiders players
Oakland Raiders players
Detroit Lions players
Arizona Cardinals players
Michigan State Spartans football players
Players of American football from Michigan
People from St. Joseph, Michigan